Piz de la Lumbreida is a mountain of the Lepontine Alps, overlooking San Bernardino in the canton of Graubünden.

References

External links
 Piz de la Lumbreida on Hikr

Mountains of the Alps
Mountains of Switzerland
Mountains of Graubünden
Lepontine Alps
Two-thousanders of Switzerland
Mesocco